The Montana Public Service Commission (PSC) is a quasi-judicial regulatory board of elected officials in the U.S. state of Montana.

The PSC regulates private, investor-owned natural gas, electric, telephone, water and private sewer companies doing business in Montana. In addition, the PSC regulates intrastate railroads and certain motor carriers hauling regulated commodities. The PSC oversees natural gas pipeline safety regulations. There is a major effort by the legislature and commissioners to put social-media companies under PSC jurisdiction as well.

Commissioners 
The Montana Public Service Commission, PSC, has since 1975 served as a five-member board with commissioners serving staggered four-year terms.

Democrat former District 3 Commissioner John Vincent of Gallatin Gateway and District 4 Commissioner Gail Gutsche, also a Democrat, lost their bids for a second term on the commission during the November 2012 election to Koopman and Hamilton, both Republicans. The 2012 election created the first all-Republican commission since its establishment in 1975 as a five-member commission.

Republican Brad Johnson, former Secretary of State of Montana, bested state Rep. Galen Hollenbaugh in the November 2014 election to fill the District 5 seat on the PSC. Commission Chairman Bill Gallagher, a Helena Republican, opted not to seek reelection to the seat amid an ongoing battle with pancreatic cancer, which he said could limit his ability to serve a second term on the commission.

Districts
The 5 districts of the Commission are separated by county as follows:

District 1:
Blaine, Cascade, Chouteau, Daniels, Dawson, Fergus, Garfield, Hill, Judith Basin, Liberty, Petroleum, Phillips, Richland, Sheridan, Roosevelt, Toole, Valley, Wibaux

District 2:
Big Horn, Carbon, Carter, Custer, Fallon, Powder River, Prairie, Rosebud, Treasure, Yellowstone

District 3:
Beaverhead, Broadwater, Deer Lodge, Gallatin, Golden Valley, Jefferson, Madison, Meagher, Musselshell, Park, Silver Bow, Stillwater, Wheatland

District 4:
Granite, Lincoln, Mineral, Missoula, Powell, Sanders, Ravalli

District 5:
Flathead, Glacier, Lake, Lewis and Clark, Pondera, Teton

How the agency works 
The PSC's office is located at 1701 Prospect Ave. in Helena, Montana, where a staff of more than 30 employees, including economists, engineers, attorneys, rate analysts and others, work for the Department of Public Service Regulation. The agency works to "fairly balance the long-term interests of Montana utility and transportation companies and the customers they serve," according to the agency's Mission Statement. The department operates under the executive branch of Montana government, with the Public Service Commission overseeing the department, the Mission Statement states.

The commission generally meets once per week for its general business meeting — typically at 9:30 a.m. each Tuesday — with audio and video of the meeting streaming online at www.psc.mt.gov. Meeting times and dates may change depending on commissioners' travel schedules and the scheduling of other matters before the commission. Commission meetings are open to the public in the Bollinger Room at the PSC offices in Helena. The commission occasionally meets in executive session to discuss issues it, or the agency's attorneys, believe fall within the guidelines for closing a meeting per the state's open meeting laws. While the PSC is a public agency, utilities have the option to seek a protection order and request documents be held confidential by the commission, but must make a showing to the commission that the information meets guidelines for protection as outlined in section 38.2.5007 of the state of Montana's procedural rules for public service regulation.

Because the job is often complex and requires a thorough understanding of the utility industry, the commission relies on its staff for a wide range of research, data analysis and number crunching. The PSC's staff often appears before the commission during its weekly business meetings to discuss findings and research pertaining to matters before the commission.

The Public Service Commission likens the process of establishing utility rates to that of a banker considering a loan. While the agency doesn't loan money, "It analyzes the company's financial statements for accuracy, examines its operating practices to ensure efficiency, and reviews known future events that may affect the business."

The Commission's website, however, points out a significant contrast between the role of a banker and that of a commissioner:

"The banker would be pleased if a loan applicant could make very high profits. By law, the PSC must allow only those profits that are just and reasonable. In other words, the PSC must allow utilities an opportunity to earn just enough profit so that utility owners will have the incentives to provide adequate service to customers. No more, no less. It is this public interest protection that makes the PSC unique. The Montana Consumer Counsel, meanwhile, represents Montana consumers and intervenes on behalf of the ratepayers on issues before the Public Service Commission.

While the job of regulating utilities can be highly technical, the five commissioners and dozens of staff employees review filings made with the agency. Commissioners work within the agency from individual offices near the Capitol in Helena. Also housed within the agency are the Legal, Utility and Transportation/Centralized Services divisions. While agency employees typically live in the city of Helena, commissioners are elected from five districts across the state and often frequently travel back and forth between their home towns and the PSC offices, or make other arrangements that allow them to spend time at the agency's offices in Helena and to attend the commission's weekly meeting. Koopman and Vincent traded barbs during the 2012 election on the topic of commuting to the PSC from District 3 and meeting attendance.

PSC's approval of utility's $900M purchase of 11 hydroelectric assets 
While the PSC has in previous years made headlines in Montana for its sometimes heated disagreements and personality conflicts, one regulatory issue remained at the forefront of the commission's agenda since late 2013. NorthWestern Energy on Oct. 11, 2013 notified the Commission that it planned to seek pre-approval from the Public Service Commission to purchase 11 hydroelectric facilities from PPL Montana, which the commission ultimately approved, with conditions, in its final order dated Sept. 26, 2014 (47-48). NorthWestern Energy in November 2014 said it had completed the transaction to purchase the 11 hydroelectric facilities with a price tag of $900 million, which translates into a 5.2 percent increase in residential power bills.

Commissioner Travis Kavulla concurred in part and dissented in part in the final order, which includes a more than 30-page dissenting opinion from the commissioner (56-89). Kavulla wrote that he dissents from pre-approval of the utility's purchase "for two basic reasons," but that he concurred with some portions of the final order (56). Kavulla argued that he's "skeptical of NorthWestern's valuation of the 11 hydroelectric dams and one storage reservoir (the Hydros) it wishes to purchase. A company ordinarily would have a strong incentive not to over-state the value of an asset it wishes to acquire. That is not the case here. The Commission's Order irrevocably places into consumer rates the $870 million NorthWestern has asked for. The price consumers pay over the next few decades for these assets should be rooted in valid estimates of the assets' market value, but it cannot simply be assumed that the purchase price represents a fair market value" (56).

Kavulla further states in his dissenting opinion that had NorthWestern Energy been required to "stand by the predictions it is making" on the valuation of the assets, that his skepticism might be lessened (57). Kavulla added, " Unfortunately, this Order divests the utility of almost all responsibility in this regard."

In a six-page concurring opinion also included in the final order, Commissioner Roger Koopman wrote that in his review of the utility's application to purchase the assets, he finally determined that "the benefits of the purchase clearly outweighed the risk, and joined the majority in supporting approval" (51). Still, Koopman said the utility had threatened to "undermine" the process by saying it would "walk away from the deal" if the commission sought to make substantive changes. "This threat of termination was ubiquitous, and was expressed in terms that limited Commission prerogatives and afforded commissioners as little room to maneuver as possible" (52).  Koopman added that he doesn't agree with everything in the order, but that for the most part he believes the utility's purchase of the assets is "in the public interest" (54). He also wrote in his opinion that a large amount of information in the application and review process "stood on estimations, projects and judgement calls" and that it is difficult to gauge the final outcome of the commission's final order (54). Koopman wrote in the order, "We live in the present, trying to predict the future from whatever facts we have at hand. Those predictions will already be inaccurate 24 hours from now, based on events over which we have no control. We must rely on the collective wisdom of 5 commissioners and 35 dedicated staff, and on the expressed desires of the people of Montana. It is a process that, while far from perfect, works quite well" (55).

References

External links
 Montana Public Service Commission Website

Montana
State agencies of Montana